Livingstone Mpalanyi Nkoyoyo (4 October 1938 – 5 January 2018) was a Ugandan Anglican bishop. He served as the Archbishop and Primate of the Church of Uganda from 1995 to 2004. He was married to Ruth Nalweyiso, since 1965 until his death, and the couple had five children, of which one died before him.

Early life
Nkoyoyo was one of the 25 children of Erisa Wamala Nkoyoyo, a sub-county Chief during Sekabaka Edward Mutesa II's reign. He grew up in a wealthy family, since his father was a rich landowner. He studied at Mpenja Primary School, in Gomba, Aggrey Memorial School and Mityana Junior Secondary School. He moved a lot due to his fathers work and had to leave school after completing Junior Secondary School. He then started working as an auto mechanic, for which he kept a lifelong interest.

Ecclesiastical career
He felt his religious calling at a youth camp, at Ndoddo Church, in Gomba District. Shortly after, he became a full-time minister, starting as a church teacher. After attending an ordination training course, he was ordained an Anglican deacon, at Namugongo, on 3 June 1969.

He served as a Suffragan Bishop in Namirembe Diocese, becoming the first Bishop of the Diocese of Mukono, in 1983. He was elected to the House of Bishops of the Church of Uganda to be their 6th Archbishop and Primate, in 1995. He would be in office until 24 January 2004. He was awarded the Bible Leadership Excellence Award by the Bible Society of Uganda, in 2015.

Death
He had successful treatment for cancer in Great Britain in early 2017. He died of pneumonia, at Kampala Hospital, aged 79 years old. He was laid to rest at the Uganda Martyrs Anglican Shrine in Namugongo, on 9 January 2018.

See also 

 Church of Uganda 
Mukono

References

External links
Livingstone Nkoyoyo dead at 80, Anglican Ink, 5 January 2018

1938 births
2018 deaths
20th-century Anglican archbishops
20th-century Anglican bishops in Uganda
21st-century Anglican archbishops
Anglican archbishops of Uganda
Uganda Christian University alumni
People from Central Region, Uganda
People from Mityana District
Ugandan Anglicans
Anglican bishops of Mukono
Anglican bishops of Namirembe